Gruffydd Fychan ap Iorwerth Goch (c. 1150 – 1221) was a medieval Welsh knight and marcher lord.

He was known by the epithet "y Marchog Gwyllt o Gae Hywel" ('the Wild Knight of Cae Howell'), Cae Howell being a manor near Kinnerley, Shropshire.

He held the titles Knight of Rhodes and Knight of the Order of Saint John of Jerusalem.
 
He succeeded to his father's estates in Kinnerley.

Family
Gruffydd was the eldest son of Iorwerth Goch and Maud de Manly.

He married first, Matilda ferch Ieuan, with whom he had the son Gruffydd Fychan ap Gruffydd (1190) of Cae Howell. This son was the first to hold the surname "Kynaston".

He married second, Matilda le Strange (1170), daughter of Guy le Strange, with whom he had the children Hywel ap Gruffydd and Sir Madog ap Gruffydd of Sutton Maddock, Shropshire.

References

1150s births
1221 deaths
Welsh knights
Marcher lords